Tubby-related protein 1 is a protein that in humans is encoded by the TULP1 gene.

TULP1 is a member of a family of tubby-like genes (TULPs) that encode proteins of unknown function. Members of this family have been identified in plants, vertebrates, and invertebrates. 

The TULP proteins share a conserved C-terminal region of approximately 200 amino acid residues. TULP1 is a candidate gene for retinitis pigmentosa-14 (RP). Mutation in TULP1 is a rare cause of recessive RP and TULP1 plays an essential role in the physiology of photoreceptors.

References

Further reading